Charles Aubrey Mark Walker (born 21 May 1992) is an English cricketer.  Walker is a right-handed batsman who bowls right-arm off break.  He was born in Bristol.

While studying for his degree at Oxford Brookes, Walker made his first-class debut for Oxford MCCU against Lancashire in 2011.  He made a further first-class appearance for the team in that season, against Sussex.  In his matches in 2011, he scored 69 runs at an average of 34.50, with a high score of 43.

During the 2011 season, he also made his Minor counties debut for Herefordshire, making four appearances in the Minor Counties Championship against Shropshire, Hertfordshire, Cornwall and Wales Minor Counties.

References

External links
Charlie Walker at ESPNcricinfo
Charlie Walker at CricketArchive

1992 births
Living people
Cricketers from Bristol
Alumni of Oxford Brookes University
English cricketers
Oxford MCCU cricketers
Herefordshire cricketers